Richard More O'Ferrall  (10 April 1797 – 27 October 1880) was an Irish politician, a high level British government official and a Governor of Malta. Born to a noble Irish Catholic family at Balyna, he was the eldest son and heir of Ambrose More O'Ferrall, Lord of Laois and Prince of Annally. Educated at Stonyhurst College, More O'Ferrall entered politics young, becoming Member of Parliament for Kildare in 1830. In 1839, More O'Ferrall married Matilda, daughter of The 3rd Viscount Southwell, KP. After holding many senior roles, he was appointed Governor of Malta in 1847, a post he held until 1851. He was known to be a very honourable man and was made a deputy lieutenant and a justice of the peace as well as a Member of the Privy Council of the United Kingdom. He stepped down as a Member of Parliament for Kildare in 1865. More O'Ferrall was widely respected, both in Ireland and Great Britain and has been praised for his achievements while Governor of Malta.

Early life
Richard More O'Ferrall was born in Balyna in Moyvalley, County Kildare, Ireland, to the House of More O'Ferrall, a powerful Irish family of ancient lineage whose ancestors, the O'Mores, ruled the county of Laois. The ancestral home of the More O'Ferrall family is Balyna House, on the land given to the family as a New Year's gift by Elizabeth I in 1574. Richard More O'Ferrall was the eldest son of Major Ambrose O'Ferrall (1752–1835) and his first wife, Anne Bagot, daughter of John Bagot, patriarch of another prominent Catholic family based at Castle Bagot, Co. Dublin. 
More O'Ferrall was directly related to two of the most famous Lords of Laois, Ruairí Óg Ó Mórdha and Rory O'Moore. He grew up on the family estate of Balyna, in Kildare and attended Downside School and Stonyhurst College.
He was elected to the British House of Commons in 1832, and represented the Constituencies of County Kildare from 10 December 1832 to 29 July 1847, and subsequently Longford from 21 April 1851 to 7 July 1852 and Kildare again from 28 April 1859 to 11 July 1865.

Career
He was elected to the British House of Commons in 1832, and represented the Constituencies of County Kildare from 10 December 1832 to 29 July 1847, and subsequently Longford from 21 April 1851 to 7 July 1852 and Kildare again from 28 April 1859 to 11 July 1865.

Under the Whig administration of Lord Melbourne, He entered the Government as a Lord Commissioner of the Treasury in 1835, and remained so until 1837.

He was a close friend of Cardinal Nicholas Wiseman. O'Ferrall served as a trustee of the Catholic College, St. Patrick's College, Maynooth.

On 28 September 1839, More O'Ferrall married Matilda (died 1882), the second daughter of The 3rd Viscount Southwell, KP. The couple had a son, Ambrose, and a daughter, Maria Anne, who married the Crimean War hero Sir Walter Nugent, 2nd Baronet, of Donore, Co. Westmeath, eldest son of Sir Percy Fitzgerald Nugent, 1st Baronet.

A week after his marriage, on 4 October 1839, More O'Ferrall was appointed to the Government as First Secretary of the Royal Navy, a post he retained until June 1841, when he briefly became Secretary to the Treasury. In October 1847 he became Governor of Malta. and, in 1841, Secretary to the Treasury. In 1847 he was the first civilian to hold the post of Governor of Malta. As such he helped develop the island into one of Britain’s most important strategic naval bases. He also secured the passing of a new Constitution for Malta in 1849, which effectively allowed for Maltese home rule. On 12 September 1851 More O'Ferrall resigned as governor, refusing to serve under Lord John Russell, whose Ecclesiastical Titles Act was designed to prevent a restoration of the Roman Catholic hierarchy in England.

At the 1830 general election he came forward for an unexpected opening in county Kildare with the backing of the local Independent Club, citing his support for reform and retrenchment and opposition to the Irish Subletting Act and the ‘odious and vexatious monopoly’ of the East India Company. At the nomination he refuted the charge of an opponent that he was ‘intemperate’ and a ‘wild theorist’. ‘You will have an efficient Irish colleague in Richard O’Ferrall, he is pretty sure of success’, Robert Cassidy informed Sir Thomas Wyse, 12 Aug. After a two-day contest he was returned in second place. In September 1830 he was one of 15 Members who signed a Dublin requisition for a meeting in support of the French revolution. He voted for repeal of the Subletting Act, 11 Nov. and reduction of West Indian wheat import duties, 12 Nov. He had of course been listed by the Wellington ministry as one of their ‘foes’, and he voted against them on the civil list, 15 Nov. On 20 Nov. he joined Brooks's, sponsored by the Duke of Leinster and Lord Essex. That month he was named by Daniel O'Connell as a ‘proper person’ to present petitions against the grant to the Kildare Place Society.5 On 6 Dec. he presented one for repeal of the Union, but doubted that it would ‘afford a remedy’ and advocated ‘general reform’ and more measures ‘to relieve the distresses of Ireland’. His comments were condemned by O’Connell, but he spoke again in similar terms, 11 Dec. 1830, when he complained that Ireland had not received the attention from governments that she had ‘a right to expect’ and had been passed over for additional representatives. He ‘spoke like a sensible and fluent English country gentleman’, recorded Sir Denis Le Marchant, 1st Baronet†, adding to James Abercromby that he made,

"A considerable impression, especially as amidst his expression of very determined feelings he alluded to O’Connell in by no means a laudatory manner and assured government that the influential classes of society in Ireland were guided by very different principles and quite independent of his control. The subject once started, people in the lobbies and rooms were all talking of it, and I saw some who did not treat it as a slip, and what must somehow or other be corrected.6
On 22 Feb. 1831 More O’Ferrall wrote to advise James Emerson of Belfast that he would support the extension of Littleton’s truck bill to Ireland, but that ‘some Irish Members think it would be injurious and prevent the employment of weavers’ and that ‘those interested’ should send petitions to Parliament.7 He sympathized with Catholic hostility to the Kildare Place Society, which used the Scriptures ‘contrary to the feelings or even the prejudices of the people’, 14 Mar. He presented another petition for repeal, 16 Mar. He voted for the second reading of the Grey ministry's reform bill, 22 Mar., and against Gascoyne's wrecking amendment, 19 Apr. 1831."

At the ensuing general election he offered again as an ‘unflinching advocate’ of the reform bill and its extension to Ireland, and ‘every measure of economy and retrenchment’. A threatened opposition came to nothing and he was returned unopposed.8 On 27 June 1831 he presented two petitions for draining Irish bogs and obtained leave to introduce an embankments bill for removing obstacles from rivers. He steered it through the Commons and, after amendment by the Lords, it received royal assent, 20 Oct. (1 & 2 Gul. IV, c. 57). He asserted the ‘positive right’ of Ireland ‘to receive assistance by way of grant’, 30 June. He voted for the second reading of the reintroduced reform bill, 6 July, gave steady support to its details, and divided for the third reading, 19 Sept., and its passage, 21 Sept. He divided for the second reading of the Scottish bill, 23 Sept., and Lord Ebrington's confidence motion, 10 Oct. On 14 July he denounced the ‘system of proselytism’ carried on by the Kildare Place Society, with which he had ceased to co-operate after finding that ‘unless the poor were protected by a gentleman of their own persuasion, their religious principles were interfered with’; he presented petitions against giving it further grants, 5 Sept. He was in the minority for a reduction of the civil list, 18 July. He welcomed the introduction of lord lieutenants for Irish counties, as the country had suffered ‘very badly under the present regulations’, 25 July. He voted against disqualification of the Dublin election committee, 29 July, and the issue of a writ, 8 Aug., and with ministers on the controversy, 23 Aug. On 5 Aug. he defended the conduct of Maynooth College, which was inspected twice a year, and called for a ‘liberal system of education’ to be adopted throughout Ireland. That day he presented and endorsed petitions against the additional drawback on Irish malt, which enabled Scottish distillers to ‘sell their whisky in Ireland at a price 20 per cent lower’. He divided in favour of printing the Waterford petition for disarming the Irish yeomanry, 11 Aug. He advocated reform of the law respecting marriages in Catholic chapels in England, the illegality of which induced husbands to ‘desert their wives’, 12 Aug. On 19 Aug. he spoke and voted against the Irish union of parishes bill, as it would force Catholics to support the construction of Protestant churches. He argued and divided for legal provision for the Irish poor and demanded that a third of Irish church revenues be conferred on the ‘destitute’, 29 Aug. He welcomed proposed reforms to the Irish grand jury system, 16, 29 Sept. He voted for inquiry into the conduct of the Hampshire magistrates during the arrest of the Deacles, 27 Sept. 1831.

More O’Ferrall regretted that ministers had ‘departed from the principle of giving additional Members to Ireland’ and warned that this would lead to ‘political agitation’ and the ‘commission of acts that both England and Ireland deplore’, 12 Dec. 1831. He paired for the second reading of the revised reform bill, 17 Dec. 1831, again supported its details, and divided for the third reading, 22 Mar. 1832. He voted for the address calling on the king to appoint only ministers who would carry it unimpaired, 10 May. He voted for the second reading of the Irish bill, 25 May, but was in the minority of 61 for an increase in the Scottish county representation, 1 June. He divided for O’Connell's motion to extend the Irish county franchise to £5 freeholders, 18 June, welcomed the enfranchisement of 20 year leaseholders, 25 June, and voted against the liability of Irish electors to pay municipal taxes before they could vote, 29 June. On 18 July he advocated the division of Irish counties into polling districts, explaining that in ‘long and narrow’ Kildare the expense of bringing voters to the poll was ‘very great’. That day he demanded that the ‘degradation’ of swearing an oath against the pope at the poll be dispensed with. On 9 Feb. he voted with ministers on relations with Portugal. He divided in favour of printing the Woollen Grange petition for the abolition of Irish tithes, 16 Feb., brought up similar petitions, 31 Mar., 9 July, 7 Aug., and voted against the Irish tithes bill, 8 Mar., and steadily thereafter. He feared it would provoke ‘constant war and constant tumult’, 13 Mar., considered that ‘the representatives of the people’ were ‘bound to resist the passing of a law’ based on ‘imperfect information and ex parte evidence’, 2 Apr., and was a minority teller against its second reading, 6 Apr. On 27 Feb. he protested that the anatomy bill would create ‘a premium for murder in my own country’, as there would be an ‘open market’ for bodies, and voted against it. He welcomed the new plan of Irish education, 6 Mar., and attacked the tactics of its opponents, observing that it had been ‘well received by all the Catholics’ and ‘a great portion of the Protestants, and that ought to be sufficient’, 28 June. On 3 Apr. he welcomed the Catholic marriages bill, as the present laws were a ‘disgrace to the statute book’. That day he unsuccessfully pressed Smith Stanley, the Irish secretary, for correspondence relating to the dispatch of troops to Kildare at the time of anti-tithe meetings, which was ‘very likely’ to aggravate the ‘excitement and irritation ... already too prevalent in Ireland’. He called for the ‘greatest caution’ and the ‘immediate attention of the legislature’ to Irish outrages, 23 May, and was appointed to the select committee on the disturbances, 30 May. He presented and endorsed a petition and was a minority teller against the bill to transfer King's County assizes from Philipstown to Tullamore that day. He voted for a tax on absentee landlords to provide permanent provision for the Irish poor, 19 June, and spoke in similar terms, 10 July. He divided with government on the Russian-Dutch loan, 12, 16, 20 July. On 23 July he denounced a Protestant tract of the ‘most offensive and disgusting kind’ written by Sir James Gordon, saying that it contained the ‘grossest misrepresentations of the Catholic tenets’, which he would ‘not have thought it worthwhile’ to notice, had Gordon not last year made some assertions against Maynooth, which ‘I have been blamed for not answering’. Denouncing the ‘inoperable’ tithes bill the next day, he observed that ‘we are placed in a difficult situation between the government on the one hand and our constituents on the other’, and urged the House to ‘remember the Stamp Act’, with its ‘precisely similar proceedings’, by which ‘America was lost to England’. On 2 Aug. 1832 he promised to ‘resist its operation by every means in my power, short of force’. He was in the minority of ten for the reception of a petition for abolition that day.

At the 1832 general election, More O’Ferrall was re-elected after a contest against two other Liberals. He declined the Grey ministry's offer of a lordship of the treasury in June 1834, but on Lord Melbourne's return to power in April 1835 took office.9 He retired from county Kildare in 1847 and in October of that year was appointed Governor of Malta. by the Russell administration. On 12 September 1851 More O'Ferrall resigned as Governor, in protest, refusing to serve under Lord John Russell, whose Ecclesiastical Titles Act was designed to prevent a restoration of the Roman Catholic hierarchy in England. He came in on a ‘chance vacancy’ for county Longford in April 1851 but did not stand for re-election the following year. He sat again for county Kildare from 1859 until 1865, when he retired from public life.

Death
More O'Ferrall died on the 27th October 1880 in Kingstown (present-day Dún Laoghaire), County Dublin. He had been a magistrate, grand juror, politician, aristocrat, governor and deputy-lieutenant for his native country. At his death, he was the oldest member of the Irish privy council. He was succeeded by his only son Ambrose (1846-1911), who in April 1880 unsuccessfully contested county Kildare as a Liberal.

Arms

Ancestry

Sources

Secondary sources

http://www.thepeerage.com/

External links 
 

1797 births
1880 deaths
UK MPs 1831–1832
UK MPs 1832–1835
UK MPs 1835–1837
UK MPs 1837–1841
UK MPs 1841–1847
UK MPs 1847–1852
UK MPs 1859–1865
Members of the Privy Council of the United Kingdom
Politicians from County Kildare
People educated at Stonyhurst College
Governors and Governors-General of Malta
Members of the Parliament of the United Kingdom for County Kildare constituencies (1801–1922)
Members of the Parliament of the United Kingdom for County Longford constituencies (1801–1922)
O'Moore family